Ilıksu Cave is a cave located in Ilıksu, Zonguldak Province, northern Turkey.

References

Caves of Turkey
Caves of Zonguldak Province